Still Falling is a 2021 Nigerian romantic drama film co-directed by Karachi Atiya and Dimbo Atiya. The film stars Daniel Etim Effiong, Sharon Ooja, Kunle Remi in the lead roles. The film had its theatrical release on 12 February 2021 on the eve of Valentine's weekend. The film was shot and set in Abuja.

Cast 
 Sharon Ooja as Bono
 Daniel Etim Effiong as Lagi
 Bethel Njoku as Eric
 Laura Fidel as Intoh
 Eddy Madaki as Truemoney Executive 
 Lulu Okonkwo as Kore
 Panam Percy Paul as Bishop Gowon
 Chavala Yaduma as Xo
 Liz Ameye as Bono's mother 
 Kunle Remi as Tunde
Abundance Effiong as Associate Pastor

Crew 

 Directed by Dimbo Atiya - Karachi Atiya 
 Story by Dimbo Atiya 
 Produced by Prince Aboki
 Cinematography by Tom Robson
 Edited by Johnson Awolola 
 Casting by Mnena Akpera
 Music Edited Shaddi Justin

References 

English-language Nigerian films
Nigerian romantic drama films
2021 romantic drama films
Films shot in Abuja
2020s English-language films